Paranna Munavalli (born 1954) is an Indian politician and a member of Karnataka Legislative Assembly from Gangawati constituency.

Political life 
He defeated incumbent MLA Iqbal Ansari in the 2008 Karnataka Legislative Assembly elections, but was defeated by the same person during the 2013 Karnataka Legislative Assembly elections. He was elected in 2018 Karnataka Legislative Assembly elections against Iqbal Ansari.

References

External links 

 Karnataka Legislative Assembly

1954 births
Living people
Bharatiya Janata Party politicians from Karnataka
Karnataka MLAs 2018–2023
People from Koppal district